The Bayne House, at 37 Main St. in Shelbyville, Kentucky, was built in 1915 in Classical Revival style.  It was listed on the National Register of Historic Places in 1984.

It is a central passage plan house with a curved two-story portico.  Its hallway has dado panelling and an open, square stairwell with elaborate balusters.  Its hall and two front rooms have cove cornices. Mary Bayne, who lived there, wrote Crestlands about the founding of the Christian Church.

It has also been termed The Coachstop.

It was listed as part of a larger study of historic resources in Shelbyville.

References

National Register of Historic Places in Shelby County, Kentucky
Neoclassical architecture in Kentucky
Houses completed in 1915
Houses on the National Register of Historic Places in Kentucky
Houses in Shelby County, Kentucky
Buildings and structures in Shelbyville, Kentucky
1915 establishments in Kentucky
Central-passage houses